The 13th Annual American Music Awards were held on January 27, 1986.

Winners and nominees

References

 

1986